The Kremenchuk Hydroelectric Power Plant is a run-of-river power plant on the Dnieper River just upstream of Kremenchuk in Svitlovodsk, Ukraine. The primary purpose of the dam is hydroelectric power generation and navigation. It is the third dam in the Dnieper cascade and creates the largest reservoir on the river. Construction on the dam began in May 1954, the reservoir began to fill in October 1959, the last generator was commissioned in 1960 and the dam and power plant were inaugurated in 1961. It is operated by Ukrhydroenergo.

See also 
 Hydroelectricity in Ukraine

References

External links

Dams completed in 1959
Energy infrastructure completed in 1960
Dams in Ukraine
Dams on the Dnieper
Hydroelectric power stations in Ukraine
Run-of-the-river power stations
Hydroelectric power stations built in the Soviet Union
Economy of Kirovohrad Oblast